John F. Ince is an author, business journalist, documentary filmmaker, social entrepreneur, podcaster and nonprofit administrator. He is the host and creator of PodVentureZone, a regular podcast for the Venture Capital and entrepreneurial community and Founder / CEO of I-INSPIRE: An Operating System for the Social Economy.

As a journalist he covered the growth of the Internet economy as a contributing editor with Upside magazine during the heyday of the dotcom boom and subsequent bubble burst. He wrote major features on B2B, Search Engines, Supply Chain Management, E-Learning, EMS, Venture Capital Investment Banking and portals. His early articles on Google in 2000 and 2001 were among the first articles to predict the fledgling search engine's eventual success.

In 2005, he completed a documentary film on the U.S. National Debt titled TIME-BOMB: America's Debt Crises Causes Consequences and Solutions. The film featured interviews with prominent businesspeople (George Soros, Peter G. Peterson, Steven Rattner), U.S. senators (Warren Rudman, Robert Byrd, Pete Domenici) and economists (Harvard's Benjamin M. Friedman and Kenneth Rogoff, and Boston University's Laurence Kotlikoff). In April 2006 the film was broadcast on national television, and again aired in August 2006.

He began his journalistic career as a reporter with Fortune magazine in New York City and later joined the junior faculty of Harvard Business School, where he helped develop case materials and the curriculum for the "Management of Technological Innovation" course. He also worked on cases on solar energy and assisted with the New York Times bestseller, Energy Future, Report of the Harvard Business School Energy Project. He worked as a casewriter at Harvard's John F. Kennedy School of Government under the supervision of former Massachusetts Governor and Presidential Candidate, Michael Dukakis.

He is the author of three books and his writings have appeared in The Wall Street Journal, The New York Times, the San Francisco Chronicle, Upside magazine and numerous other publications.

Ince was selected as a featured hero by The Emily Fund's Do One Thing program, primarily for his role as the creator of the Earth Pledge Campaign. In that capacity, he wrote "The Earth Pledge", a short statement of personal commitment that was made by millions of Americans on the 25 anniversary of Earth Day in 1995. Today, school children in schools around the country recite the Earth Pledge as a complement to the Pledge of Allegiance.

Ince spent is the founder of One World Inc. and the Earth Aid Foundation, which assists with fundraising for a broad array of environmental groups by creating special events such as concerts and bikeathons.
 
Ince received his bachelor's degree in 1970 with honors in history from Harvard University, where he was an all American athlete in lacrosse, a member of three national championship squash teams and First Marshal, (President) of his graduating class. In 1973 he received his MBA from Harvard Business School, with a major in finance.

References

External links 
http://www.johnince.com
https://web.archive.org/web/20170507162030/http://time-bomb.org/

American male journalists
American film directors
Harvard Business School faculty
Living people
Year of birth missing (living people)
Harvard Business School alumni
Place of birth missing (living people)
Harvard College alumni
American company founders
American chief executives